The Disability History Association (DHA) is an international non-profit organization that promotes the study of disabilities. This includes, but is not limited to, the history of individuals or groups with disabilities, perspectives on disability, representations/ constructions of disability, policy and practice history, teaching, theory, and disability and related social and civil rights movements.

The DHA defines both history and disability widely. This organization is both inclusive and international, reflected in its diverse topics and approaches. Membership is open to scholars, institutions and organizations, and others working in all geographic regions and all time periods.

The DHA offers its members a community of active and interesting historians; access to its resources page, which includes a newsletter, conference information, sample syllabi, and helpful links; as well as an opportunity to help build an exciting field.

As an academic organization, the Disability History Association strives to attract more professional and public attention to the importance of disability as a category of analysis and the histories of people with disabilities in the past and present. As the DHA website says: “This organization is both inclusive and international, reflected in our diverse topics and approaches. Membership is open to scholars, institutions and organizations, and others working in all geographic regions and all time periods.” The Disability History Association is an affiliated member of the American Historical Association (AHA) and the Organization of American Historians (OAH) to promote inclusivity of disability in the profession and discipline.

History of the Disability History Association

The origin of the Disability History Association came from informal conversations by a group of pioneering disability scholars at the Summer Institute on Disability Studies in the Humanities at San Francisco State University in 2000. The following year, they created H-Disability, a discussion group in the prominent online scholarly platform H-Net. In 2004, the organization held its first board meeting, and then the community was incorporated into the Disability History Association in 2007. In 2008, the Disability History Association, British Disability History Group, and the San Francisco State University cosponsored an international academic conference for disability history.

Disability History Association Publication Awards

The DHA sponsors the Outstanding Publication Award, awarded annually to a book or an article which explores significant new ground in the field of disability history.  From 2012 to 2017, the DHA alternated offering the Outstanding Book Chapter or Article Award and the Outstanding Book Award, but in 2018 began offering both awards each year.

Outstanding Publication Award Winners

Current Board of Directors, 2019-2020 
Sara Scalenghe - Chair
Lindsey Patterson - Vice President
Aparna Nair - VP for Communications
Kathleen Brian - Treasurer
Caroline Lieffers - Graduate Student Representative
Nicole Belolan - Member
Susan Burch - Member
Iain Hutchison - Member
Sandy Sufian - Member
Jaipreet Virdi -Member

Past Leadership 
 Kim E. Nielsen, past president

References

History of disability
Disability studies
Disability organizations